Emad Hashim (born 10 February 1969) is an Iraqi football goalkeeper who played for Iraq in the 1996 AFC Asian Cup and 2000 AFC Asian Cup. He also played club football with Al Shorta for 14 years.

After turning in outstanding goalkeeping performances for the Iraqi youth team, Ammo Baba brought Emad Hashim into the international setup when he was just a teenager.

In the  1989 FIFA World Youth Championship in Saudi Arabia, Iraq topped a group beating Spain, Argentina and Norway to advance to the 2nd round, where they lost 2-1 to USA. Emad was in goal during the qualifying games for 1994 World Cup and also the 1996 Asian Cup campaign in the U.A.E, where he saved a penalty against the hosts in the quarterfinal before the Emirates scored a golden goal a few minutes into extra-time.

He found himself out of favour after the early exit in the World Cup qualification games for France'98, but was recalled by Milan Zivadinovic into Iraq’s 2000 Asian Cup squad.

In 2001, Croatian coach Rudolf Belin gave him a start for the World Cup qualifier against Iran in Baghdad, his last game for Iraq.

References

External links
 

1969 births
Living people
Sportspeople from Baghdad
Iraqi footballers
Iraq international footballers
Olympic footballers of Iraq
Footballers at the 1988 Summer Olympics
1996 AFC Asian Cup players
2000 AFC Asian Cup players
Al-Shorta SC players
Al-Zawraa SC players
Association football goalkeepers